Charles Joseph is an American jazz trombone player from New Orleans, Louisiana.

Career 
The son of trombonist Waldren Joseph, Joseph has played with the Majestic Band and Hurricane Brass Band, and was one of the founding members of the Dirty Dozen Brass Band.

He has also appeared on an Elvis Costello album and performed with his brother, sousaphonist Kirk Joseph, in Kirk Joseph's Backyard Groove band.

References

Year of birth missing (living people)
Living people
American jazz trombonists
Male trombonists
Dirty Dozen Brass Band members
21st-century trombonists
21st-century American male musicians
American male jazz musicians
Musicians from New Orleans
Jazz musicians from New Orleans
Musicians from Louisiana
Jazz musicians from Louisiana
Fairview Baptist Church Marching Band members